The 2009 Women's Professional Soccer All-Star Game was the first WPS All-Star Game.  In a format similar to that of recent all-star games in Major League Soccer, the WPS All-Stars played Swedish club powerhouse Umeå IK on August 30, 2009, eight days after the league's championship game. The WPS All-Stars defeated their guests 4–2.

Saint Louis Athletica named host
WPS awarded the 2009 All-Star Game to St. Louis, Missouri in a press release on June 25, 2009.  The venue was Anheuser-Busch Center in the suburb of Fenton, home of Saint Louis Athletica.

Umeå IK

Founded in 1917, Umeå IK is currently one of the premier women's clubs in Europe.  They have won six Damallsvenskan titles, and won the UEFA Women's Champions League twice, appearing in the finals five times in the eight years since the competition's founding.  Umeå was also the club that Marta played for before moving to the Los Angeles Sol.

WPS All-Stars

Voting
Eleven of the eighteen WPS All-Stars were chosen by vote.  25% of the total vote came from fans voting online, 25% from media, 25% from coaches (who were prohibited from voting for their team's players), and 25% from players.  The results of the voting were released on August 4 at 5PM ET.

Over 25,000 fan votes were cast, with the top three fan picks being Hope Solo, Lori Chalupny, and Shannon Boxx.  Despite leading the fan voting, Solo did not make the Starting XI. Marta was the overall top vote-getter, being named on the ballots of all eligible coaches, collecting 94% of the media vote, and finishing second in the player vote and fourth in the fan vote.

Multiple players who were selected to the Starting XI were playing for their national teams in the UEFA Women's Euro 2009 at the time of the All-Star game.  As such, their spots on the field were taken by the next runners-up in the voting for their respective positions.

At-Large Selections
The remaining seven players on the All-Star team were selected by Abner Rogers (head coach for the Los Angeles Sol), who was chosen by a vote of all WPS players to be the WPS All-Star coach, and Commissioner Tonya Antonucci.

2009 All-Star Rosters

Women's Professional Soccer

Bold indicates Starting XI from voting results* Indicates Starting XI players who were on national team duty in Europe at gametimeItalic indicates runners-up replacing Starting XI players on European national team duty - Tiffeny Milbrett replaced FormigaRegular typeface indicates "At Large" player selections

Umeå IK

Squad announcement* Due to Umeå also missing players for the European championships, these WPS players played for their former club.

Match details

Statistics

External links
Official Press Release

2009 Women's Professional Soccer season
Soccer in St. Louis
All-star games
2009 in sports in Missouri